The McIvor River is a river of Alberta, Canada. It is flows into Lake Claire.

References

Rivers of Alberta